Shadowboxer, is a boxing opera in two acts composed by Frank Proto to a libretto by John Chenault based on the life of Joe Louis, the legendary American boxer. Conceived and directed by Leon Major at the University of Maryland Opera Studio, it premiered on 17 April 2010 at the University's Clarice Smith Performing Arts Center.

Roles 

 Joe Louis – created by Jarrod Lee
 Young Joe – created by Duane Moody
 Marva Trotter – created by Adrienne Webster
 Max Schmeling – created by Peter Burroughs
 Lillie Brooks – created by Carmen Balthrop
 Jack Blackburn– created by VaShawn McIlwain
 Julian Black – created by Robert King
 John Roxborough – created by Benjamin Moore
 Ring announcer – created by David Blalock
 Beauty #1 – created by Madeline Miskie
 Beauty #2 – created by Amelia Davis
 Beauty #3 – created by Amanda Opuszynski
 Reporter #1 – created by Andrew Owens
 Reporter #2 – created by Andrew McLaughlin
 Reporter #3 – created by Colin Michael Brush
 Joe the boxer – created by Nickolas Vaughn
 Joe's opponents – created by Craig Lawrence

Synopsis 
The opera begins with an elderly, sickly Louis in a wheelchair, remembering scenes of his life. The first act shows him becoming a successful professional boxer and ends with his triumphal defeat of the German Max Schmeling in 1938. With this victory Louis became an American hero. The second act follows his decline, eventual defeat in the ring, and his problems with the American Internal Revenue Service.

References

Sources 
 Alenier, Karren LaLonde, "'Shadowboxer: Joe Louis Fights His Ghosts" (review), The Dressing, 21 April 2010
 Downey, Charles T, "'Shadowboxer" (review), Ionarts, 22 April 2010
 Fulford, Robert, "In This Corner: History!" (review), National Post - Toronto, 3 May 2010
 Battey, Robert, "'Shadowboxer: Based on the Life of Joe Louis' at Maryland Opera Studio" (review), Washington Post, 19 April 2010
 Weber-Petrova, Kate, "'Shadowboxer - A Tormented Joe Louis" (review), Opera Today, 24 April 2010
 Midegette, Anne, "Inspired by Joe Louis, opera 'Shadowboxer' scores one for reality", Washington Post, 17 April 2010
 Sain, Ken, "'Shadowboxer - An Opera that packs a punch" Gazette.Net, 15 April 2010
 Smith, Tim, "'Shadowboxer,' opera about legendary Joe Louis, premieres at Clarice Smith Center" (review), 'Baltimore Sun, 20 April 2010

External links 
 Clarice Smith Performing Arts Center, Press release: Newly Commissioned Opera Showcases Story of Boxing Legend Joe Louis 2, March 2009
 Shadowboxer: website
 Shadowboxer: Official website

Operas
2010 operas
English-language operas
Operas set in the United States
Boxing mass media
Operas set in the 20th century
Cultural depictions of Joe Louis
Cultural depictions of Max Schmeling
Operas based on real people